Ayatollah Haj Mirza Khalil Kamarah'i (1898, in Ferneq – 1984, in Tehran, Iran).  He was an author, researcher and philosopher of contemporary theology that sought to unite the Muslim sects supporting his cause. He studied under Abdul-Karim Ha'eri Yazdi in Arak and Qom. He continued his studies of various Islamic subjects and philosophy throughout his life. He worked with the administration in the Vatican City on various philosophical questions, which he later released in a separate book. He travelled to Cairo on behalf of Seyyed Hossein Borujerdi and Mahmud Shaltut, the Grand Mufti and dean of Al-Azhar University Sheikh, for fatwa. He was an imam for the Jamaat of Fakhr Al-dole mosque in Tehran for more than three decades and taught at the University of Theology in Tehran for five years.

Death 
He died in his home in Tehran, on Thursday 11 October 1984 after two years' illness. He was buried in Qom, near the Fatima Masumeh Shrine.

References 

Islamic philosophers
Iranian Shia scholars of Islam
20th-century Iranian historians
1898 births
1984 deaths
20th-century Iranian philosophers
Burials at Fatima Masumeh Shrine